Yguazú District is a district of the Alto Paraná Department, Paraguay.

Yguazu is a Japanese Agricultural Colony 40 kilometers to the West of Ciudad del Este.

 

gn:Yguasu (Paraguái)
es:Colonia Yguazú (Paraguay)